Aianteion was a town in ancient Troad.

Its site is located near Kumkale, Asiatic Turkey.

References

Populated places in ancient Troad
Former populated places in Turkey